Dark Manhattan is a black and white American film produced in 1937 by a partnership of African Americans Ralph Cooper and George Randol. Harry Fraser directed the film, which was written by Randol who was also the executive producer. The film was the only one made by Randol-Cooper Productions.

The film opens with a dedication to R. B. Harrison, Bert Williams, and Florence Mills "and all the pioneer Negro actors who by their many sacrifces paved the way for this presentation."

Music was by Ellison & Brooks (Ben Ellison and Harvey O. Brooks). Ben Rinaldo was associate producer.

The film stars Cooper, and focuses on an up-and-coming youngster ruthlessly taking control of the numbers racket from the ailing former boss.

The film is discussed in the book Making a Promised Land.

Cast
Ralph Cooper as Curly Thorpe
Cleo Herndon as Flo Gray
Clarence Brooks as Larry Lee
Jess Lee Brooks as Lieut. Ballot
Sam McDaniel as Jack Johnson
Corny Anderson as Atty. Brown
Rubeline Glover as Miss Hall
James Adamson as Lem

References

External links
 

1937 films
1937 crime drama films
American black-and-white films
American crime films
Race films
1930s English-language films
1930s American films